The following is a list of military operations conducted in Denmark, Finland, Norway, Sweden, Iceland and Greenland during World War II.

Axis

 Birke ("Birch") (1944)  — German plan to withdraw from northern Finland prior to the Lapland War
 Birkhahn (1945)  — German evacuation from Norway.
 Büffel ("Buffalo") (1940)  — German operation to relieve troops in Narvik, Norway
 Hokki ("Calk") (1944)  — Finnish plan to destroy railroad tracks to deny the Soviets their supplies.
 Holzauge ("Wood knot") (1942)  — activities in Greenland
 Ikarus (1940)  — planned German invasion of Iceland in response to British Operation Fork
 Juno (1940)  — German naval operation to disturb allied supplies to Norway
 Kilpapurjehdus ("Regatta") (1941)  — Finnish naval operation for the militarization of the Åland islands. 
 Lachsfang (1942)   — Proposed combined German and Finnish attack against Kandalaksha and Belomorsk
 Nordlicht 2 ("Aurora Borealis") (1944)  — German withdrawal from the Kola Peninsula into Norway
 Silberfuchs ("Silver Fox") (1941)   — German and Finnish operations in the Arctic, including:
 Blaufuchs 1 ("Blue Fox 1") (1941)  — Staging of German forces from Germany to northern Finland
 Blaufuchs 2 ("Blue Fox 2") (1941)  — Staging of German forces from Norway to northern Finland
 Platinfuchs ("Platinum Fox") (1941)   — Joint German-Finnish attack towards Murmansk from Finnish Petsamo
 Polarfuchs ("Polar Fox") (1941)   — Joint German-Finnish attack towards Kandalaksha from Finnish Lapland
 Renntier ("Reindeer") (1941)  — German occupation of Petsamo
Safari (1943)  — German operation to capture and disarm Danish forces
 Sizilien (1943)  — German raid upon Allied-occupied Spitzbergen (Svalbard)
 Tanne Ost (1944)  — failed German attempt to capture Suursaari from Finland
 Tanne West (1944)  — planned German attempt to capture the Åland from Finland
 Weserübung ("Weser Exercise") (1940)  — German invasion of Denmark and Norway
 Weserübung Nord ("Weser Exercise") (1940)  — German invasion of Trondheim and Narvik
 Weserübung Sud ("Weser Exercise") (1940)  — German invasion of Bergen, Kristiansand and Oslo
 Zitronella ("Lemon flavour") (1943)  — alternate name for Operation Sizilien

Allies

 Alphabet (1940)  — evacuation of British troops from Norway
 Apostle (1945)  — SAS operation to enforce German surrender in Norway
 Archery (1941)  — British commando raid on Vågsøy, Norway
 Anklet (1941)   — raid on German positions on Lofoten Islands, Norway
 Brandy (1943)   — MTB and commando raid on Florø, Norway
 Carthage (1945)  — RAF bombing of the Gestapo headquarters in Copenhagen, Denmark 
 Cartoon (1943)   — commando raid on the island of Stord near Leirvik, Norway
 Catherine (1939)  British plan to gain control of Baltic Sea
 Claymore (1941)  — British raid on Lofoten Islands, Norway
 Crackers (1943)  — British raid at Sognefjord, Norway
 Doomsday (1945)  — alternative name for Apostle
 Freshman (1942 ) — attempted raid on a Norwegian heavy water plant at Vemork, see Gunnerside
 Grouse (1942)  — Norwegian guide party for Freshman
 Gunnerside (1943)  — 2nd raid on the Norwegian heavy water plant at Vemork
Fork (1940)  — Invasion of Iceland by British.
 Gauntlet (1941)    — raid on Spitzbergen
 Jupiter (1942)  — suggested invasion of Norway
 Kitbag (1941)  — aborted commando raid on town of Florø in Norway
 Leader (1943)   — American/British Home Fleet raid on German shipping along the coast of Norway in the Bodø area
 Musketoon (1942)   — British/ Norwegian destruction of a power station in Norway
 R 4 (1940)  — Planned British invasion of Norway 
 Source (1943)   — British response to German operation Sizilien
 The Sepals/Perianth Operation (1944) — OSS supported operation in Sweden
 Sunshine (1944)   — Combined British/Norwegian operation to protect essential power installations against possible German scorched earth tactics towards the end of the war
 Valentine (1940)  — British occupation of the Faroe Islands
 Wilfred (1940)  — British plan to mine the Norwegian coast

Other

 Rädda Danmark ("Save Denmark") (1945)  — Swedish plan to liberate Denmark before the German surrender

 Rädda Själland ("Save Zealand") (1945)  — Swedish landings on Zealand
 Rädda Bornholm ("Save Bornholm") (1945)  — Swedish landings on Bornholm

See also
 List of World War II military operations

References

Further reading
 Dear, Ian. The Oxford companion to world war II (New York: Oxford University Press, 1995)
 Elting, John R. Battles for Scandinavia (Time-Life Books 1981)
 Haarr, Geirr. The Gathering Storm: Naval War in Northern Europe, September 1939 to April 1940 (2013) 
 Haarr, Geirr.  German Invasion of Norway: April 1940 (vol 1 2012); The Battle for Norway, April-June 1940 (vol 2 2010)
 Mann, Chris. British Policy and Strategy Towards Norway, 1941-45 (Palgrave Macmillan, 2012)
 Miller, James. The North Atlantic Front: Orkney, Shetland, Faroe and Iceland at War (2004) 
 Nissen, Henrik S., ed. Scandinavia during the Second World War (Universitetsforlaget, 1983)
 Petrow,  Richard. The Bitter Years; The Invasion and Occupation of Denmark and Norway, April 1940-May 1945 (1974) 
 Riste,  Olav et al. Norway and the Second World War (1996) 
 Stenius, H., Österberg, M. and Östling, J., eds. Nordic Narratives of the Second World War: National Historiographies Revisited (Lund: Nordic Academic Press, 2011).
 Vehvilainen, Olli. "Scandinavian Campaigns." in A Companion to World War II (2012) ed. by Thomas W. Zeiler and Daniel M. DuBois : vol 1 pp 208–21.
 Vehvilainen, Olli.  Finland In The Second World War: Between Germany and Russia (2002) excerpt and text search

 

World War II-related lists 
Danish military-related lists
Finnish military-related lists
Greenland-related lists
Iceland history-related lists
Norway history-related lists
Swedish military-related lists
Norwegian military-related lists

ca:Operacions de la Segona Guerra Mundial#Escandinàvia